"Mr. Big Stuff" is a 1971 single by Jean Knight.

Mr. Big Stuff may also refer to:

 Mr. Big Stuff (album), a 1971 album by Jean Knight
 "Mr. Big Stuff", a song by Heavy D & the Boyz from the 1987 album Living Large
 "Mr. Big Stuff", a song from the 1988 film Satisfaction
 "Mr. Big Stuff", a single by Grandmaster Mele-Mel & Scorpio from the 1997 album Right Now
 "Mr. Big Stuff", songs by Biz Markie from the albums On the Turntable (1998) and On the Turntable 2 (2000)